Pigs Are Seldom Clean (lit. "One Doesn't Fatten Pigs in Clean Water") is a Canadian drama film, directed by Jean Pierre Lefebvre and released in 1973. The film stars Jean-René Ouellet as Bob Tremblay, an undercover Royal Canadian Mounted Police officer in Hull, Quebec, whose fiancée Hélène is kidnapped and raped by the criminal gang he is infiltrating after his identity is discovered.

The film's cast also includes Marthe Nadeau, Maryse Pelletier, J.-Léo Gagnon, Jean-Pierre Saulnier, Louise Cuerrier and Denys Arcand.

Jay Scott of The Globe and Mail characterized the film as "Lefebvre's only melodrama, a film that could almost be a product of the new German Cinema."

References

External links

1973 films
Canadian crime drama films
1970s French-language films
1973 crime drama films
Films directed by Jean Pierre Lefebvre
Films shot in Quebec
French-language Canadian films
1970s Canadian films